George Bell (December 9, 1869 – June 9, 1940) was a Canadian politician. He served in the Legislative Assembly of British Columbia from 1916 to 1920 from the electoral district of Victoria City, a member of the Liberal party. He previously also served as the mayor of Enderby, British Columbia for 6 years.

References

1869 births
1940 deaths
British Columbia Liberal Party MLAs